Pauline Martin was an All-American Girls Professional Baseball League player.

Born in Columbus, Ohio, Pauline Martin joined the All American League in its 1946 season and was assigned to the Muskegon Lassies club. Additional information is incomplete because there are no records available at the time of the request.

In 1988 was inaugurated a permanent display at the Baseball Hall of Fame and Museum at Cooperstown, New York, that honors those who were part of the All-American Girls Professional Baseball League. Pauline Martin, along with the rest of the girls and the league staff, is included at the display/exhibit.

Sources

All-American Girls Professional Baseball League players
Baseball players from Columbus, Ohio 
Date of birth missing
Possibly living people
Year of birth missing